Terry Dempsey (8 March 1941 – 10 February 2019) was a South African songwriter whose songs were made famous by a number of artists.

Early life 
Born in England, he moved to South Africa in 1978 and formed two record labels, Storm and MAP.
He wrote the song "Daydreamer", which he took to Tokyo Music Festival in 1974 where it was picked up by Artie Wayne and recorded by David Cassidy. Cassidy's recording spent three weeks at the top of the UK singles chart in October and November 1973. A French adaptation, "Le Mal Aimé", recorded by Claude François, reached number 1 in France.

He also wrote "Love Is a Beautiful Song", performed by Dave Mills, which reached number 1 in South Africa, Canada and Australia. Two other songs written by him reached Number 1 in South Africa – "Spider Spider" by Tidal Wave and "Kentucky Blues" sung by Lauren Copley.
His song "Home" recorded by Dave Mills won a SARIE award in 1971 for Song of the Year.

He also wrote theme songs for South African TV shows, including Twist Grip, TopSport, DriveTime, as well as the Comrades Marathon and television series' The Power of Persuasion and Wings Over Africa.

In 1988 he joined the board of the National Organisation of Rights In Music (later called the Southern African Music Rights Organisation) for a period of three years before being elected as chairman for a further two years.

In 1999 he produced and wrote the film score for the South African feature film Heel Against the Head.

Writing credits

Some of his writing credits include:

Death
He was killed when he was struck by the blades of a gyrocopter when it made an emergency landing at the Vaal Marina during a family ash scattering.

References

1941 births
2019 deaths
South African songwriters
English emigrants to South Africa